McCreedy or Mccreedy is a surname. Notable people with the surname include:

Conor Mccreedy (born 1987), South African artist
John McCreedy (1917–1979), Canadian ice hockey player

See also
McCready
McCreery